Joel Joseph (1867 – 6 September 1942) was an Australian cricketer. He played five first-class matches for New South Wales in 1889/90.

See also
 List of New South Wales representative cricketers

References

External links
 

1867 births
1942 deaths
Australian cricketers
New South Wales cricketers
Place of birth missing